Tammy Wynette Remembered is a tribute album to Tammy Wynette. It was released on September 8, 1998 by Asylum Records, just five months after Wynette's death on April 6. The album peaked at number 18 on the Billboard Top Country Albums chart and number 111 on the all-genre Billboard 200.

Track listing

Chart performance

References

1998 compilation albums
Country music compilation albums
Asylum Records compilation albums
Tribute albums